Madras Mail is a 1936 Indian Tamil language action film directed by C. N. Trivedi. The film stars Battling Mani and T. N. Meenakshi.

Plot 
Sekar (Battling Mani) is a kind hearted young man. He helps people. Meenakshi (T. N. Meenakshi) is the daughter of a Zamindar. There was a clash between them but that blossomed into love. Sekar is trying to get a government job. Murugesan is a minister in the princely state. He wants to marry Meenakshi. He sends Sekar to jail on a false charge. But Sekar escapes from the jail with the help of an inmate (Kokko). Sekar renames himself as Madras Mail. He starts punishing people who do wrong. He helps ordinary people. In the meantime Meenakshi is abducted by someone. Zamindar has complained to the police and a search is going on. Madras Mail rescues and brings back Meenakshi. It was found that it was Murugesan, the minister, who abducted Meenakshi. The Zamindar sends Murugesan to jail. He releases Sekar aka Madras Mail and gives his daughter Meenakshi to him in marriage.

Cast 
Battling Mani as Sekar
S. R. K. Iyengar
S. S. Kokko (Real name: Pasupuleti Srinivasulu Naidu) as the inmate
Srinivasa Iyengar
T. N. Meenakshi as Meenakshi
K. R. Chellam

Production 
The film was produced by Ramaniklal Mohanlal under the banner Mohan Pictures and was directed by C. N. Trivedi. Battling Mani wrote the story while the dialogues were penned by P. R. Rajagopala Iyer. Cinematography was done by Rajinikanth Bondiya while Indukumar Bhat did the editing.
This is the first action film in Tamil.

Soundtrack 
Music was composed by S. N. Ranganathan while P. R. Rajagopala Iyer wrote the lyrics.

Reception 
In a period when cine goers were shown films with historical and mythological stories, this action film created sensation among the audience. This was the forerunner to many such films that followed suit.

References

External links 

1936 films
1930s action films
Indian action films
1930s Tamil-language films